Huascarodexia is a genus of parasitic flies in the family Tachinidae. There is one described species in Huascarodexia, H. pulchra.

Distribution
Peru

References

Dexiinae
Diptera of South America
Tachinidae genera
Taxa named by Charles Henry Tyler Townsend
Monotypic Brachycera genera